Winnie Lightner (born Winifred Josephine Reeves; September 17, 1899 – March 5, 1971) was an American stage and motion picture actress. 

Perhaps best known as the man-hungry Mabel in Gold Diggers of Broadway (1929), Lightner was often typecast as a wise-cracking gold-digger and was known for her talents as a comedian and singer. She is also noted for introducing the song "Singin' in the Bathtub" in the 1929 motion picture The Show of Shows.

Life and career

Winifred Josephine Reeves was known as Winifred Hansen.

Starting off in vaudeville at age fifteen and adopting Winnie Lightner as her stage name, she was an immediate success and played the fabled Palace theater in New York City only three months after beginning her career. With vaudeville in decline in the early 1920s, she switched to Broadway revues, where she starred in George White's Scandals of 1922, 1923, and 1924, in Gay Paree in 1925 and 1926, and in Harry Delmar's Revels in 1927.

In 1928, she made a Vitaphone short in which she sang "We Love It", "God Help a Sailor on a Night Like This", "That Brand New Model of Mine", and "We've Got a Lot to Learn." A censorship board in Pennsylvania held up the release of the film because of the content of Lightner's songs. According to film historian Alexander Walker, "Warners asked the censors to merely pass judgment on the visuals – the censors refused." 

The musical Gold Diggers of Broadway was a 1929 triumph and made her a star. Warner Bros. quickly signed her up for additional films. The first of these was She Couldn't Say No (1930), in which Lightner was cast in a maudlin dramatic role that did not suit her talents. This was followed by Hold Everything, a lavish all-Technicolor musical comedy that was a huge hit. It was followed by another highly successful picture, The Life of the Party, which was also shot entirely in Technicolor but from which most of the songs were cut prior to release.

By the end of 1930 audiences had grown tired of musicals, while Lightner was in the process of shooting three of them: Sit Tight (1931), Gold Dust Gertie (1931), and Manhattan Parade (1932). They all were released with most of the music cut. This was especially noticeable on Manhattan Parade, in which even the background music was completely removed. 

In response to the changes in public tastes, Warner Bros. decided to try another dramatic role for Lightner; the result was a picture called Side Show (1931) which proved to be unsuccessful. She appeared in two more comedies, in which she co-starred with Loretta Young – without songs – before she left Warner Bros. In the first of these, Play Girl (1932), she was billed with her name above the title, but in the second, She Had to Say Yes (1933), Young received first billing.

Family
Lightner was the mother of multiple-Emmy-award-winning cinematographer Thomas Del Ruth and was married to film director Roy Del Ruth until his death in 1961. She died in 1971, aged 71, and was interred in the San Fernando Mission Cemetery.

Filmography

See also

References

Further reading
Lightner, David L. (2016) Winnie Lightner: Tomboy of the Talkies. University of Mississippi Press. .

External links

1899 births
1971 deaths
20th-century American actresses
American film actresses
American silent film actresses
American stage actresses
Burials at San Fernando Mission Cemetery
Actresses from New York City
People from Hell's Kitchen, Manhattan